Townsend Harris High School at Queens College (THHS) is a public magnet high school for the humanities in the borough of Queens in New York City. Students and alumni often refer to themselves as "Harrisites." Townsend Harris consistently ranks as among the top 100 high schools in the United States. Since 2019, U.S. News & World Report has ranked THHS #1 in New York State; THHS ranked #19 nationally in 2022. The school was named in honor of Townsend Harris the 19th-century American merchant, politician, and diplomat who served as the first American Consul to Japan.

History

Townsend Harris High School was founded in 1984 by alumni of Townsend Harris Hall Prep School, who wanted to reopen their school that was closed in the 1940s. This process started in 1980.

The first principal was Malcolm Largmann, a former high school English teacher with a strong belief in a classical education who also handpicked the school's original faculty. Largmann served as principal of Townsend Harris from 1984 until his retirement in 2001. The new school began life in a small building on Parsons Boulevard, originally intended as a temporary home until a permanent facility could be realized. In early 1995, the school moved into a new building located on the campus of Queens College.

Brian Condon became principal after a heated debate concerning Interim Principal Rosemarie Jahoda, which was covered extensively by student reporters from The Classic.

Admissions
Well over 15,400 students compete for approximately 270 seats in the freshman class each year based on their middle school grades, standardized test scores and even attendance records. Admission is available to all New York City residents in 8th grade. A minimum grade point average of 91 is required of all applicants to be considered for admission. Minimum standardized reading and math scores at the 90th percentile are also required (4.3 on both English and Math).

Some seats are available for 9th graders wishing to start Townsend as sophomores, though as the number depends on the number of students who decide to leave the school during freshman year the number varies significantly from year to year; in 2006, only 5 were available. In 2019, just 10 seats were available to 5,000 students who applied.

Initially, the admissions process included an interview and a writing component, but this was eliminated by 1988. Upon application, students take a writing and math assessment, record a student video, and submit final middle school grades in order to apply for the school.

Academics
In addition to the standard three-year Regents English program, all students take a "fifth year" of English as freshmen in the form of a "Writing Process" composition course. In addition to the standard modern language requirement which may be fulfilled with classes in Spanish, French, or Japanese, students must meet a two-year classical language requirement which can be fulfilled by classes in Latin or classical Greek. There is also a rigorous physical education requirement, especially in freshman gym, and a senior project required of students. A variety of electives and AP classes are also offered to students. As of 2004, AP World History became a mandatory subject and replaced the Regents-level course. Every subject requires students to execute at least one major project a year, with history classes requiring one per semester and English several per semester. These projects are referred to as "collaterals."

In the 2008–2009 school year, Townsend Harris is offering the following Advanced Placement (AP) classes: World History, United States History, United States Government, Environmental Science, Psychology, Calculus AB/BC, Computer Science A, Japanese Language and Culture, Latin: Vergil, Statistics, French Language, Art History, Computer Science Principles, AP Macroeconomics, AP Microeconomics, and Spanish Language, Spanish Literature.

The most notable feature of the school's curriculum is the senior "Bridge Year" program. Students in good standing may take up to 12 credits at Queens College at no cost to themselves. This includes an elective course taught by Queens College faculty and a required humanities seminar co-taught by Harris teachers and Queens College faculty. The curriculum and format is fairly similar to the Great Books seminars required of liberal arts freshmen at colleges around the world, with heavy emphasis on critical reading and writing.

Recently, a number of other New York City public high schools have been established that have similar "bridge year" programs. These include the High School of American Studies at Lehman College, Queens High School for the Sciences at York College, and Bard High School Early College.

Student body
In sharp contrast with the original school which was open to male students only, the new school has been dominated by female students from its inception, today comprising approximately 70% of the student population.

As of 2019, the school's minority population is largely Asian, with the New York City Department of Education's "Asian and other" category making up 44% of the student body total, comprising the largest segment of the school's population. White students comprise 37% of the population, Hispanic students 12% and black students 7%.

48% of students at Townsend Harris are from an economically disadvantaged background.

The school maintains a 100% graduation rate.

Miscellaneous
The attendance rate is the highest in NYC. Scores on standardized examinations are also high when compared to other public high schools; in the year 2005–2006, Harrisites had average scores of 628 and 632 on the SAT verbal and math sections, respectively, compared to 551 and 565 for what the city deems "similar schools" and 444 and 467 for students citywide. In 2000 Eileen F. Lebow published a history of the original school, The Bright Boys: A History of Townsend Harris High School.

Accomplishments

 The Blue Ribbon Schools of Excellence Foundation named Harris a 21st Century School of Distinction in June 2004. In December of that year, the school was named a Lighthouse School by the same organization.
In 2005 and 2006, the school had the highest percentage of students passing Regents exams of any New York City Department of Education high school.
 2006-2007 Highest Percentage Passing AP World History Scores in the US for a Large School

Notable alumni

Scholars
 Manfred Halpern, political scientist expert in modern Middle East

Writing and journalism
 Neil Drumming (1992) journalist, writer, and director of the film Big Words (2013), and podcast producer for This American Life, Serial, and The New York Times

Performing arts and entertainment
 Irving Caesar (1910) was a lyricist whose works include: "Swanee," and "Tea for Two". He co-wrote the songs in the musical No, No, Nanette, and was an early collaborator with George Gershwin.
 Ervin Drake (1935) was an American songwriter whose works include such American Songbook standards as "I Believe" and "It Was a Very Good Year".
 Ira Gershwin (1914) was a lyricist who collaborated with his brother, composer George Gershwin, to create songs such as "I Got Rhythm", "Embraceable You", "The Man I Love", "Someone to Watch Over Me" and songs for the opera Porgy and Bess.
 Yip Harburg, a lifelong friend of schoolmate Ira Gershwin, wrote the lyrics to standards "Brother, Can You Spare a Dime?", "April in Paris", "It's Only a Paper Moon", and all of the songs for the movie The Wizard of Oz, including "Over the Rainbow". 
 Hari Kondabolu (2000) is an American stand-up comic.
 Frank Loesser is an Oscar, Tony, and Pulitzer prize award-winning composer and songwriter best known for Guys and Dolls and How to Succeed in Business Without Really Trying.
 Edward G. Robinson (1910) was an actor known for films like Little Caesar, Double Indemnity, Key Largo and The Ten Commandments.

Business, economics, and philanthropy
 Divya Narendra (2000)
 Alexander Sachs was a banker and economist, best known for delivering the Einstein–Szilárd letter to Franklin Roosevelt, and convincing him to begin research into the construction of a nuclear weapon.
 Bennett Cerf, co-founder of Random House, author, publisher and panellist on 'What's My Line.'

Law, politics, and activism
 Nily Rozic is a New York State Assemblywoman
 Ben Ferencz is a lawyer who served as chief prosecutor against perpetrators of the Nazi Holocaust at the Nuremberg War Crimes Trials

Medicine
 Jonas Salk (1931), an American virologist and medical researcher who developed one of the first successful polio vaccines.

References

External links

 Townsend Harris High School Official Website

1904 establishments in New York City
Educational institutions established in 1904
Public high schools in Queens, New York
Magnet schools in New York (state)
Kew Gardens Hills, Queens